

First-round selections
The following are the first round picks in the 1989 Major League Baseball draft on June 5.

Supplemental first round selections

Other notable players

 Brian Hunter, 2nd round, 35th overall by the Houston Astros
 Tim Salmon, 3rd round, 69th overall by the California Angels
 Jerry Dipoto, 3rd round, 71st overall by the Cleveland Indians
 Shane Reynolds†, 3rd round, 72nd overall by the Houston Astros
 John Olerud†, 3rd round, 79th overall by the Toronto Blue Jays
 Phil Nevin†, 3rd round, 82nd overall by the Los Angeles Dodgers, but did not sign
 Eric Wedge, 3rd round, 83rd overall by the Boston Red Sox
 Brook Fordyce, 3rd round, 84th overall by the New York Mets
 Denny Neagle†, 3rd round, 85th overall by the Minnesota Twins
 Jeff Bagwell‡, 4th round, 110th overall by the Boston Red Sox
 Scott Erickson†, 4th round, 112th overall by the Minnesota Twins
 Ryan Klesko†, 4th round, 116th overall by the Atlanta Braves
 Alan Embree, 5th round, 125th overall by the Cleveland Indians
 J. T. Snow, 5th round, 129th overall by the New York Yankees
 Paul Quantrill†, 6th round, 163rd overall by the Boston Red Sox
 Russ Springer, 7th round, 181st overall by the New York Yankees
 Butch Huskey, 7th round, 190th overall by the New York Mets
 Curt Leskanic, 8th round, 203rd overall by the Cleveland Indians
 Mike Lansing, 9th round, 219th overall by the Baltimore Orioles, but did not sign
 Sterling Hitchcock, 9th round, 233rd overall by the New York Yankees
 Jeffrey Hammonds†, 9th round, 237th overall by the Toronto Blue Jays, but did not sign
 Chad Mottola, 10th round, 245th overall by the Baltimore Orioles, but did not sign
 Scot McCloughan, 10th round, 266th overall by the New York Mets
 Marty Cordova, 10th round, 269th overall by the Minnesota Twins
 Kelly Stinnett, 11th round, 281st overall by the Cleveland Indians
 Trevor Hoffman‡, 11th round, 290th overall by the Cincinnati Reds
 Jim Thome‡, 13th round, 333rd overall by the Cleveland Indians
 Mike Trombley, 14th round, 373rd overall by the Minnesota Twins
 Pat Rapp, 15th round, 388th overall by the San Francisco Giants
 Gregg Zaun, 17th round, 427th overall by the Baltimore Orioles
 Brian Giles†, 17th round, 437th overall by the Cleveland Indians
 Mark Grudzielanek†, 17th round, 450th overall by the New York Mets, but did not sign
 Tim Worrell, 20th round, 520th overall by the San Diego Padres
 Jeff Kent†, 20th round, 523rd overall by the Toronto Blue Jays
 Robert Person, 25th round, 645th overall by the Cleveland Indians
 Joe Randa, 30th round, 773rd overall by the California Angels, but did not sign
 Joe Borowski, 32nd round, 823rd overall by the Chicago White Sox
 Dana Brown, 35th round, 898th overall by the Philadelphia Phillies
 Hilly Hathaway, 35th round, 903rd overall by the California Angels
 Jorge Posada†, 43rd round, 1,116th overall by the New York Yankees, but did not sign
 Jason Giambi†, 43rd round, 1,118th overall by the Milwaukee Brewers, but did not sign
 Eric Young†, 43rd round, 1,123rd overall by the Los Angeles Dodgers
 Chad Curtis, 45th round, 1,157th overall by the California Angels
 Bobby Magallanes, 50th round, 1,260th overall by the Seattle Mariners
 Denny Hocking, 52nd round, 1,314th overall by the Minnesota Twins

† All-Star  
‡ Hall of Famer

NBA/NFL players drafted
 Scott Burrell, 1st round, 26th overall by the Seattle Mariners, but did not sign
 Jeff Brohm, 7th round, 176th overall by the Montreal Expos, but did not sign
 Rodney Peete, 13th round, 348th overall by the Oakland Athletics, but did not sign
 Marcus Robertson, 19th round, 489th overall by the Cleveland Indians, but did not sign

References

External links
 Complete 1989 draft list from Baseballist.com

Major League Baseball draft
Draft
Major League Baseball draft